Thallium(I) hydroxide, also called thallous hydroxide, TlOH, is a hydroxide of thallium, with thallium in oxidation state +1.

Synthesis 
Thallium(I) hydroxide is obtained from the decomposition of thallium(I) ethoxide in water.

C2H5OTl + H2O → TlOH + C2H5OH

This can also be done by direct reaction of thallium with ethanol and oxygen gas.

4 Tl + 2 C2H5OH + O2 → 2 C2H5OTl + 2 TlOH

Another method is the reaction between thallium(I) sulfate and barium hydroxide.

Tl2SO4 + Ba(OH)2 → 2 TlOH + BaSO4

Properties 
Thallous hydroxide is a strong base; it dissociates to the thallous ion, Tl+, except in strongly basic conditions. Tl+ resembles an alkali metal ion, A+, such as Li+ or K+.

References

Hydroxides
Thallium(I) compounds